Guangzhou a sub-provincial city, the second most populated prefectural-level division of People's Republic of China and it is divided into 11 districts. Guangzhou is further divided into 135 Subdistricts and 35 Towns.

County-level divisions

Township-level divisions

Yuexiu

Liwan

Haizhu

Tianhe

Baiyun

Huangpu

Panyu

Huadu

Nansha

Zengcheng

Conghua

Historical divisions

ROC (1911-1949)

1949-1960

1960-2000

Since 2000

References

Guangzhou